Adio Marchant (born 24 September 1987), known professionally as Bipolar Sunshine, is an English singer and songwriter from Manchester, England. Previously the co-vocalist with the band Kid British, he embarked on a solo career in 2013.

Career
Marchant was born and raised in Manchester, the son of Jamaican parents who separated when he was still young. In 2007, he co-founded and contributed vocals in the six-piece Kid British. The band went on to have a moderately successful career and released five EPs between 2009 and 2012 before splitting with a final farewell gig in Manchester in December 2012.

His debut solo EP as Bipolar Sunshine, Aesthetics, was produced/co-written with Jazz Purple and released in June 2013, with the lead track "Rivers" becoming iTunes' "free single of the week". His next EP Drowning Butterflies followed in November 2013 and featured the single "Love More Worry Less".

In 2014, Bipolar Sunshine embarked on A Dream for Dreamer's Tour in the UK, with his London show at XOYO sold out 5 weeks in advance. He released two singles produced by Jazz Purple: "Where Did the Love Go" which was featured on BBC Radio 1's playlist and "Deckchairs on the Moon" which charted at no. 85 in the UK Singles Sales Chart and also no. 93 in the UK Downloads Chart. He appeared at the Blissfields festival and headlined Shepherd's Bush Empire.

His song "Daydreamer" was used in BBC One's 2015 trailer. The track became arguably his most successful single to date, peaking at no. 67 in the UK Downloads Chart and no. 129 in the main UK Singles Chart in February 2015. He supported the Courteeners at their gig at Manchester's Heaton Park and performed at Kendal Calling in July 2015. He contributed vocals on DJ Snake's popular 2016 single "Middle" which was a top 10 hit in the UK.

Discography

Albums
 The Visionary Tape  (2018)
 3034 (2022)

Extended plays
 Aesthetics (2013)
 Drowning Butterflies (2013)
 iTunes Festival: London 2013 (2013)
 Spotify Sessions London (2014)
 Night B4 Christmas (2017)
 Imaginarium (2018)

Singles
 "Rivers" (2013)
 "Love More Worry Less" (2013)
 "Where Did the Love Go" (2014)
 "Deckchairs on the Moon" (2014)
 "Daydreamer" (2014)
 "Whole Heart"  (2016)
 "The Scientist" (2017)
 "Are You Happy" (2017)
 "Tears" (2017)
 "Major Love" (2017)
 "Easy to Do" (2018)
 "Pressure" (2018)
 "Pedestal" (2018)
 "Away"  (2019)
 "Mexico"  (2019)
 "DiCaprio"  (2019)
 "Ex WiFi"  (2020)
 "Twinkle"  (2020)
 "Tears in the Tate"  (2020)
 "Sola"  (2020)
 "Changes"  (2020)
 "Somebody's Beloved"  (2020)
 "Gone" (2021)
 "Answers" (2021)
 "Lost at Sea (Illa Illa 2)"  (2021)
 "Cruise n Crash" (2021)
 "Too Young" (2022)

As featured artist

References

External links

1987 births
21st-century Black British male singers
British contemporary R&B singers
British pop singers
British hip hop singers
British male songwriters
English people of Jamaican descent
Living people
Musicians from Manchester